Samla is a genus of sea slugs, specifically aeolid nudibranchs, marine gastropod molluscs in the family Samlidae.

Species 
Species within the genus Samla are as follows:
 Samla bicolor (Kelaart, 1858)
 Samla bilas (Gosliner & Willan, 1991)
 Samla macassarana (Bergh, 1905)
 Samla riwo (Gosliner & Willan, 1991)
 Samla rubropurpurata (Gosliner & Willan, 1991)
 Samla takashigei Korshunova, Martynov, Bakken, Evertsen, Fletcher, Mudianta, Saito, Lundin, Schrödl & Picton, 2017
 Samla telja (Ev. Marcus & Er. Marcus, 1967)

References

Samlidae